Jorge Aiello (born November 27, 1978, in Buenos Aires, Argentina) is an Argentine footballer currently playing for Leandro N. Alem of the Primera C Metropolitana in Argentina.

Teams
  Deportivo Merlo 1999-2002
  Deportes Concepción 2002
  Deportivo Merlo 2003-2007
  Barracas Central 2007-2009
  Villa Dálmine 2009-2010
  Leandro N. Alem 2010–present

References

 Profile at BDFA 

1978 births
Living people
Argentine expatriate footballers
Argentine footballers
Deportivo Merlo footballers
Deportes Concepción (Chile) footballers
Expatriate footballers in Chile
Association football defenders
Footballers from Buenos Aires